Mr. Warmth: The Don Rickles Project is a 2007 documentary film about stand-up comedian Don Rickles, which was first screened at the 2007 New York Film Festival and then shown on HBO.

The documentary and its producers – Robert Engelman, John Landis, Mike Richardson, and Larry Rickles – earned a Primetime Emmy for Outstanding Variety, Music, or Comedy Special in 2008. Don Rickles also won a Primetime Emmy Award for Individual Performance in a Variety or Music Program for his appearance in the documentary. The documentary was Sidney Poitier's final film appearance before his death in January 2022.

Structure
The film consists of performance clips from throughout Rickles' career interspersed with recent interviews with him. A show at the Stardust Casino in Las Vegas from 2006 is featured most prominently. The film also features some of Rickles' notable television and movie appearances, including his many appearances on The Tonight Show Starring Johnny Carson. There are also interviews from several stand up performers and celebrities who have encountered Rickles over the years.

Interviewees

 Dave Attell
 Roseanne Barr
 Ernest Borgnine
 James Caan
 Mario Cantone
 Jack Carter
 Roger Corman
 Billy Crystal
 Robert De Niro
 Clint Eastwood
 Whoopi Goldberg
 Kathy Griffin
 Christopher Guest
 Penn Jillette
 Jimmy Kimmel
 Larry King
 John Landis
 Peter Lassally
 John Lasseter
 Steve Lawrence
 Jay Leno
 Richard Lewis
 George Lopez
 Peggy March
 Ed McMahon
 Bob Newhart
 Regis Philbin
 Sidney Poitier
 Carl Reiner
 Debbie Reynolds
 Joan Rivers
 Chris Rock
 Bob Saget
 Martin Scorsese
 Harry Shearer
 Sarah Silverman
 Bobby Slayton
 Keely Smith
 Dick Smothers
 Tom Smothers
 John Stamos
 Harry Dean Stanton
 George Wallace
 Robin Williams

Reception
The film was generally well liked by critics. Much of the praise was directed at Rickles himself for being such an engaging personality.  One critic compared Rickles and his sense of humor favorably to the racist comments of Michael Richards and the anti-Semitic statements of Mel Gibson writing: "While Rickles seems to mock ethnicity, body type, weight, age and all the other stuff that we're not supposed to make fun of, he's actually defusing all of those things. And once they're deflated by humor, they lose, at least for a moment, their potency. What becomes clear in Landis' film is that Rickles is really a softie, a guy who loves humanity and life. The guy they still call Mr. Warmth really is, and that's apparently the worst-kept secret in show business.  When Richards lost it at the comedy club, he was spewing pure hate. Rickles wouldn't know hate if it bit him in the butt." Critics also noted how Landis seemed at least as interested in showcasing Rickles's humor as he did in Rickles' life.

References

External links
 
 

2007 films
Documentary films about entertainers
American documentary films
Documentary films about comedy and comedians
2007 documentary films
HBO documentary films
Films directed by John Landis
Films produced by John Landis
2000s English-language films
2000s American films